The Griffin Cup is an annual rugby league fixture between the national teams of  and the  that has been contested since 2013.

Results

References

Rugby league international tournaments
Rugby league in Germany
Rugby league in the Netherlands